The Angostura Formation is a Late Miocene (Mayoan to Montehermosan in the SALMA classification) geologic formation of the Borbón Basin in northwestern Ecuador.

Description 
The formation is resistant to erosion and is largely barren, but at a few places there are lenses or interbeds filled with finely preserved fossils. The formation overlies the Viche Formation, and is overlain by the lower Onzole Formation. The Angostura Formation is time-equivalent with the fossiliferous Gatún Formation of Panama.

Fossil content 
The formation has provided bivalve and gastropod fossils.

See also 
 List of fossiliferous stratigraphic units in Ecuador

References

Further reading 
 
 P. Jung. 1989. Revision of the Strombina-group (Gastropoda; Columbellidae), fossil and living. Schweierische Paläontologische Abhandlungen 111:1-298
 A. A. Olsson. 1964. Neogene Mollusks From Northwestern Ecuador
 E. H. Vokes and H. E. Vokes. 2000. Catalogue of Tulane University fossil localities.

Geologic formations of Ecuador
Miocene Series of South America
Neogene Ecuador
Messinian
Tortonian
Chasicoan
Mayoan
Montehermosan
Sandstone formations
Conglomerate formations
Shallow marine deposits
Formations